Eva Heir (born 27 January 1943) is a Norwegian politician for the Socialist Left Party.

She served as a deputy representative to the Norwegian Parliament from Nord-Trøndelag and Akershus during the terms 1989–1993 and 1993–1997. In total she met during 103 days of parliamentary session.

References

1943 births
Living people
Socialist Left Party (Norway) politicians
Deputy members of the Storting
Politicians from Nord-Trøndelag
Akershus politicians
Place of birth missing (living people)